The National Provincial Championship, often simply called the NPC, is an annual round-robin rugby union competition in men's domestic New Zealand rugby. First played during the 2006 season, it is the second highest level of competition in New Zealand alongside the Ranfurly Shield. It is organised by New Zealand Rugby (NZR) and since 2021, it has been known as the Bunnings NPC after its headline sponsor. A concurrent women's tournament is also held, the Farah Palmer Cup.

Following the 2005 season the league was restructured into a two-tier competition. The National Provincial Championship would include professional and semi-professional players, and consist of the top fourteen financial and best performing regional teams. For sponsorship reasons it was rebranded as the Air New Zealand Cup. The remaining teams would form a breakaway amateur competition known as the Heartland Championship.

Twenty-nine teams have competed since the inception of the competition in 1976. Auckland are historically the most successful union with seventeen titles and Canterbury is the most successful team during the professional-era, having won nine from eleven finals. Eight other teams have won titles from both periods: Wellington (5), Waikato (3), Otago (2), Tasman (2), Bay of Plenty (1), Counties Manukau (1), Manawatu (1), and Taranaki (1).

History

Origins and foundation 

The first form of competition came in 1904 with the introduction of the Ranfurly Shield as a challenge trophy. The fixtures were planned
each year in Wellington at the New Zealand Rugby Football Union annual meeting. An elected representative from each provincial union would submit a list of proposed dates and opponents that ideally wouldn't conflict with their local club competitions. In various parts of the country, regular matches were organised by neighbouring regions for challenge trophies. One of the most prestigious competitions presented in 1946 by Timaru's former mayor, A.E.S. Hanan, was the Hanan Shield. It was contested between Mid Canterbury, South Canterbury, and North Otago. Another notable trophy was the Seddon Shield, which was first challenged in 1906. It was named after the former premier of New Zealand, Richard Seddon and featured representative teams from Buller, Nelson Bays, Marlborough, and the West Coast. In the North Island, starting in the King Country and heading northwards, eleven teams played for the Coronation Shield.

In light of the fact that were so many competitions throughout New Zealand, a national tournament was needed and demanded. In 1972, Barry Smith proposed an inter-provincial competition to the Auckland Rugby Union. Once approved by the union, it was called for discussion at the New Zealand Rugby Football Union annual conference in early 1974. The proposal contained an overview of the scheme and covered matters of finance, travel, sponsorship potential, general implications in respect of club and sub-union competitions, traditional representative matches, international laws and Sunday play. Following a meeting in October 1975, modifications were made and eventually accepted by all provinces. Radio New Zealand was awarded sponsorship rights worth NZD 100,000. They also contributed to the marketing of the new proposed competition that was later followed by Lion Breweries, National Mutual, and Air New Zealand. Teams competed in one of two divisions. The representative performance of each team over the previous five years determined which division they would play in. The premier division was decided by a ranking mechanism and determined Auckland, Bay of Plenty, Canterbury, Counties, Hawke's Bay, Manawatu, Marlborough, North Auckland, Otago, Southland, and Wellington to take part. The remaining provinces, Buller, East Coast, Horowhenua, King Country, Mid Canterbury, Nelson Bays, North Otago, Poverty Bay, South Canterbury, Taranaki, Thames Valley, Waikato, Wairarapa Bush, Wanganui and the West Coast were split into North Island and South Island sub-divisions with the possibility of promotion to the top division.

Creation of Air New Zealand Cup 
The inaugural 2006 season was played by 14 teams over 13 weeks from 28 July until the grand final on 21 October. The inaugural format saw the season split into two rounds. In round one teams split into two pools and played everybody in their pool as well as a bye week. In round two the top three teams from each pool went into the top six, which faced every team they did not play in round one Every other team was split into either Repêchage A and Repêchage B, and the winners of each repêchage filled the two remaining spots for the quarter-finals with the top six. The quarter-finals were followed by semifinals and a grand final. The new competition saw the introduction of four teams elevated from Division two of the 2005 NPC; Counties Manukau, Hawke's Bay, Manawatu and Tasman (the amalgamation of the Nelson Bays and Marlborough unions). The competition was won by Waikato 37–31, after they beat Wellington in the Grand final in front of a capacity crowd of 25,000 fans at Waikato Stadium. The leading try-scorer was emerging star Richard Kahui from Waikato with eight tries, and the leading point-scorer was Jimmy Gopperth from Wellington with 121 points.

The 2007 season saw the NZRU dumping the pool system. The new format opened with a 10-week round-robin where each team missed out on playing three of the other teams. The finals format was not changed from 2006, with the quarter-finals, semi-finals and a grand final. The champion was Auckland, defeating Wellington in Wellington's second successive grand final. Auckland finished the season at the top of the points table with a record 48 competition points, winning all ten matches. Jimmy Gopperth again finished as leading points scorer with a record 155, while Brent Ward from Auckland was the top try scorer with eight tries.

Canterbury dominance 

The 2008 champion was Canterbury, handing Wellington its third consecutive grand final defeat in a low-scoring 7–6 game. Blair Stewart from Southland was the leading points-scorer, with 105 points, while Wellington's Hosea Gear was top try scorer with a record 14 tries. In August, the New Zealand Rugby Union announced that the Tasman and Northland teams would be relegated to lower competition after the completion of the season for failure to meet criteria which included financial stability, population, training, development, playing history, and administration. This decision was reversed in September, with Tasman and Northland remaining in the competition for two more years 

2009 saw more changes in the format. The season, which ran from 30 July to 25 October, was changed to a straight round-robin tournament where every team faced the others once over 13 weeks. Quarter-finals were dropped, with the top four regular season teams advancing directly to the semi-finals and the winners from each semi moving to the grand final. Regular season points were earned as per the Rugby Union Bonus Points System; 4 points for a win, 2 points for a draw and 1 point for scoring 4 tries or for losing by 7 points or less. Semi-finals were played between four teams, the teams are seeded first to fourth and the two highest seeded teams play at home against the two lowest seeded teams meaning first plays fourth and second plays third. The highest seed still remaining in the grand final played at home.

The 2010 ITM Cup was the 34th provincial rugby union competition, the fifth since the competition reconstruction in 2006 and the first under the new sponsor of ITM. It ran for 15 weeks, with 13 used for a round robin and 2 for the finals, from 29 July to 5 November.

Changes in 2011 saw the 14 teams split into two divisions, with the top seven playing in the Premiership, the rest in the Championship. The two divisions played each other, though their ten-game round-robin season saw each team playing only four games per year against teams in the 'other' division. Other key principles introduced were that the competitions must include Super Rugby players, have a stand-alone window, feature a full round-robin and play-offs, have promotion/relegation, guarantee four and five home games per team, be completed within a 10- to 12-week window and conclude by the end of October.

In December 2015, Mitre 10 was announced as the new sponsor of all of New Zealand's major domestic rugby union competitions effective with the 2016 season. This included the top-level men's competition, formerly known as the ITM Cup; the second-level men's Heartland Championship, most recently sponsored by Pink Batts; the Women's Provincial Championship; and the Jock Hobbs Memorial National U19 tournament. This deal ran through to the 2020 season and was not renewed.

Recent years 
In 2021 Bunnings Warehouse replaced Mitre 10 as the competition's main naming sponsor in a 3-year deal. The competition format of the Bunnings NPC was the same as that of the Mitre 10 Cup for the 2021 season, but from 2022 the competition has reverted to a single division format with the 14 teams arranged into two conferences. The top four teams in each conference qualify for the knockout stages.

Teams 

The teams that have participated in the National Provincial Championship since its founding in 2006 until the current 2022 season are listed below. Fourteen teams have participated in the National Provincial Championship over that time. They all adhere to the New Zealand rugby union framework, with ten teams having been situated in the North Island and four teams in the South Island.

Provincial rugby, which comes after Super Rugby and international sides such as the All Blacks, is the third tier of rugby union in the nation. Below this tier is club competitions, which are run and differ by province. In each of these provinces, there are close to 500 clubs nationwide that are connected to both their region and New Zealand Rugby. Each province has a different number of clubs, ranging from six for the smaller unions, like West Coast, to more than thirty for larger unions, like Canterbury and Auckland. Numerous clubs predate their provincial or national union.

With the creation of two distinct competitions in 2006, thirteen teams, together with the newly established Tasman Rugby Union, remained in the newly restructured competition. The remainder formed an amateur competition called the Heartland Championship. The teams who were chosen to stay were reorganised to play professionally. In order for the area to field a squad for the 2006 season, Tasman was established in December 2005. This became the newest provincial union in New Zealand, having been created through the amalgamation of Nelson Bays and Marlborough Rugby Union.

Another one of New Zealand's newest provincial rugby unions, North Harbour was founded in 1985, which was followed by Tasman. After North Harbour being promoted to the first division in 1987, they entered the National Provincial Championship by taking first place in the third division in its inaugural year. While the former competition received further additional participants such as the Central Vikings, another two unions underwent name changes throughout its time. In 1994, the 1920-founded North Auckland Rugby Union changed its name to Northland. South Auckland Counties was established with full union status in 1955. The following year, the name was abbreviated to Counties, and in 1996 the organisation changed its name to Counties Manukau.

Following a review conducted after the 2007 season, New Zealand Rugby declared Northland and Tasman might be removed from the competition due to widespread support for a smaller Air New Zealand Cup. However, after members unanimously decided to keep the fourteen-team structure, both teams appealed the decision to be eliminated and won their case. But their existence at top level was conditional upon them meeting further requirements. The relationship between the Nelson and Marlborough unions, which broke down the previous year, needed to be repaired and kept together by Tasman. Additionally, they had to persuade the NZR of their financial viability and begin making payments on a loan they had received from the organisation worth NZD 340,000. Furthermore, Northland had to make governance changes that include a new chief executive and the current board had to resign, seeking a re-election.

 One of the two home fields used by the Bay of Plenty Rugby Union is the Tauranga Domain. It serves as both their main stadium and training facility, with the Rotorua International Stadium serving as a temporary location for the occasional fixture.
 Home matches for the Tasman Rugby Union alternate between Blenheim and Nelson. Their main training facility is located at Trafalgar Park, where their headquarters is located in the vicinity. An alternative host for games is Lansdowne Park.

Structure and finances

Format 
In December 2005, the final pools and draws for the inaugural Air New Zealand Cup were made. The competition was established as a result of a thorough competitions review conducted by the New Zealand Rugby Union. The season started at the end of July, and fourteen teams participated. Auckland, Bay of Plenty, Canterbury, Counties Manukau, Hawke's Bay, Manawatu, North Harbour, Northland, Otago, Southland, Taranaki, Tasman, Waikato, and Wellington were the teams that were revealed. A two-pool, two-round competition in which the unions participated was followed by a finals round including quarterfinal, semifinal, and final matches. Based on first-round rankings, teams competed in a top-six pool and a bottom-eight repechage in the second round. The top two teams from the repechage joined the top-six teams in the quarterfinals. Pools were based on the seedings at the end of the 2005 National Provincial Championship.

The New Zealand Rugby Union conducted a meeting after the inaugural season to assess how well the tournament went in its first year and to seek formal feedback from its stakeholders and the provincial unions. The meeting's conclusion confirmed that the fourteen teams currently playing would remain for the 2007 season. Later, it was revealed that the format would be altered, with seven matches being played each week during a ten week modified round robin, followed by quarterfinals, semifinals, and final matches. The modified round robin didn't have all teams playing one another. This was based on a team's performance in competition during the previous season. A formula was established to determine which teams did not play each other.

Sponsorship 

The competition was known as the Air New Zealand Cup from 2006 to 2009. Air New Zealand, the national carrier of New Zealand, held the naming rights during that time. It was announced in March 2010 that the building suppliers' cooperative ITM, which is owned by New Zealand, would sponsor the tournament from 2010 to 2012. Air New Zealand opted to give up their sponsorship rights in order to concentrate their efforts on helping the New Zealand national men's team.

ITM continued owning sponsorship naming rights until another bidder beat them for the 2016 season. The Heartland Championship was also backed by the business. It was referred to as the ITM Cup during its existence. However, they wished to extend their sponsorship once their agreement expired in 2015. ITM submitted a bid, however the New Zealand Rugby Union informed them that it had not been accepted. ITM was not given the opportunity to match the new sponsor's investment, and no explanation as to why it was overlooked for both competitions the following year.

New Zealand owned home improvement and garden retailer, Mitre 10 took over sponsorship in 2016 after they were announced the new title sponsor for the national domestic rugby union competition. With the inclusion of the Farah Palmer Cup, and support of the Jock Hobbs Memorial National under-19 tournament, Mitre 10 became the first sponsor of all major fifteens domestic rugby competitions in New Zealand.

Bunnings Warehouse assumed sponsorship of the tournament on a three-year arrangement prior to the 2021 season, changing the competition's name back to the National Provincial Championship. The Bunnings NPC would be the official name of the competition. Additionally, Bunnings would support the Heartland Championship, Super Rugby Aotearoa under-20 competition, and the Farah Palmer Cup.

Salary cap 
The preliminary determination on a proposed salary cap from the Commerce Commission was made public in March 2006, according to the New Zealand Rugby Union. The organisation declared that it was confident that the pay cap restrictions would bring benefits to the public that would offset any reduction in competition. This was contingent upon the pay cap being strong and strictly enforced. The hiring of Craig Neil and Cameron Good to the positions of manager and advisor for the salary cap was later confirmed by Steve Tew. Along with the announcement, it was stated that each of the fourteen teams was permitted to spend up to two million NZD annually on player salaries and other benefits.

The Commerce Commission was considering overturning its ruling that allowed the New Zealand Rugby Union to impose player movement restrictions and a salary cap. The NZRU modified its employment policies between the 2006 and 2011 seasons, classifying all players as employees rather than independent contractors. Since all of the professional athletes were employed, the Commerce Act did not apply, and there was no violation of the Act's anti-competitive provisions. As a result, the Commission thought about overturning its judgement.

Information about player salaries and the salary limit was made public in 2015. It was revealed that no matter if a player participates in a single game or not, the minimum worth of any contract is NZD 18,000, and that sum counts towards the salary cap. No union can spend more than a little over one million on salaries. Any individual contract cannot be worth more than NZD 55,000 per season. The NZRU pays provincial unions $50,000 for each contracted New Zealand international they have on file that participates in a World Cup. The union is required to reimburse the NZRU a pro rata sum if that player becomes available for any reason in order to have access to that athlete. Internationals who are unable to play because of test obligations are not subject to the salary cap.

Champions 

The winner of the Bunnings NPC trophy, also known as the Rugby Cup from the previous tournament, is chosen annually in New Zealand Rugby's National Provincial Championship final match. After the semi-finals, a New Zealand city is selected to host the contest, with the semi-final victor with the highest seed receiving home field advantage. Waikato defeated Wellington to become the first province to win the competition following its reorganisation and departure from the former tournament, which concluded in 2005.

Prior to the tournament undergoing a redesign in 2006, the previous competition was split into three divisions, with division one being acknowledged and recognised as the champion. The promotion and relegation structure was reintroduced in 2011 until disbanding after the 2021 season. These divisions were known as the Premiership and Championship. The winner of the Premiership was crowned the competition's champion, whereas the winner of the Championship was elevated to the Premiership in order to compete for the title. Nine teams were promoted over this time. Bay of Plenty, Counties Manukau, Manawatu, North Harbour, Taranaki, Tasman, Waikato, and Wellington had once all received promotion, whereas Hawke's Bay had been promoted on three different occasions.

With nine titles, Canterbury leads all other teams in final victories; Auckland, Tasman, and Waikato each have two; Taranaki and Wellington each have one. The most final appearances of eleven and most consecutive appearances with six in a row from 2008 to 2013 belong to Canterbury. From 2006 to 2009, Wellington was the only other team to make at least four straight appearances. Wellington has also lost a record number of six finals compared to Tasman's four, Auckland's three, Waikato's two, and Canterbury's two. The only union with a flawless record is Taranaki, which won their sole finals appearance in 2014.

Finals appearances by union 
In the sortable table below, teams are ordered first by number of appearances, then by number of wins, and finally by season of first appearance.

Second-tier champions 
For the 2011 season, three midweek games were agreed upon by all provincial teams in a one-off arrangement to accommodate an expanded Super 15 and the Rugby World Cup. The entire competition would be played over eight weeks, reduced from twelve. The final was held the week before the World Cup began; there were no semifinals. This was necessary because, according to IRB regulations, the World Cup host was required to cease all domestic rugby action a fortnight or more before the beginning of the competition in order to give all venues enough time to display their sponsors' logos. The brand-new two division format was introduced at this time. Those placed from first to seventh made up the Premiership after the 2010 ITM Cup, and teams ranked eighth to fourteenth made up the Championship. Each team would play four crossover games in addition to every other team in their division.

The Premiership and Championship division structures were removed after the 2021 season, returning all fourteen teams to compete for a single title. This was partly because teams had requested a change to the current structure and desired that every side have the opportunity to compete for the championship. Andrew Thompson, the chairman of the Taranaki Rugby Football Union board, collaborated with the other provinces to provide a new format to the NZR.

Only two teams, Auckland and Canterbury, haven't competed in the Championship tier. Northland and Otago, on the other hand, have both participated in the Championship each year. Only one side, Hawke's Bay, has won the Championship more than once, their 2020 victory adding to their 2011 and 2015 successes. Of the twelve teams that have participated in the Championship, there have been eight different winners. With the exception of Taranaki in its final season, no Championship team has ever won each of its four crossover matches in a single season.

Honours 
The inaugural trophy was first displayed at the tournaments' launch at Auckland's Mt Smart Stadium in July 2006. It was also stated that it would be on display for the general public to witness during the competition's opening game, which was played in Napier between Hawke's Bay and Canterbury. Thorkild Hansen, the son of Jens Hoyer Hansen, crafted the trophy by hand. Black basalt from the Bombay Hills was used to create the polished stone base by Waihi stone carver Jeff Beckwith. The 45-centimeter-tall cup was constructed of 2.7 kilograms of sterling silver and weighed 3.9 kilograms.

Ranfurly Shield 

The Ranfurly Shield, colloquially known as the Log o' Wood, is perhaps the most prestigious trophy in New Zealand's domestic rugby union competition. First presented to Auckland in 1902, the Shield is based on a challenge system, rather than a league or knockout competition as with most football trophies. The holding union must defend the Shield in challenge matches, and a successful challenger becomes the new holder of the Shield. The Shield holder at the end of each season is required to accept at least seven challenges for the following year. All home games during league play, but not during knockout playoffs, in the NPC or Heartland Championship are automatic challenges. The remaining Shield defences must be made up of challenges from unions in the other domestic competition. For example, since North Harbour, an Air New Zealand Cup team, held the Shield at the end of the 2006 season despite losing their home quarter-final to Otago, they were forced to defend the Shield against Heartland Championship teams during the 2007 pre-season. Having successfully done so, all their home fixtures in the round-robin phase were Shield defences until they lost the shield to Waikato. The Shield is currently held by Wellington.

Inter-union trophies

Player awards 
The Duane Monkley medal, named in honour of the legendary Waiakto player who played 135 games for the province between 1987 and 1996, was unveiled by New Zealand Rugby in 2017. The player of the year award is decided by a season-points system. Match officials choose their players of the match and award three points, two points, and one point for the game's top three performers. Prior to 2017, it was simply given to the best player during the season and was selected by a committee of committee members, retired players, and media representatives.

See also 

 Rugby union in New Zealand
 History of rugby union in New Zealand
 List of New Zealand rugby union teams
 Heartland Championship
 National Provincial Championship
 Ranfurly Shield
 Farah Palmer Cup

References

External links 
 Official website (archived)
 National Provincial Championship news at Prime Rugby (archived)
 National Provincial Championship news at Rugby Week
 National Provincial Championship news at Rugby Week (archived)
 National Provincial Championship overview at All Blacks

2
National Provincial Championship
Rugby union competitions for provincial teams
Professional sports leagues in New Zealand